Ahmed Mekehout (born April 4, 1983) is an Algerian football player. He currently plays for JS Kabylie in the Algerian Ligue Professionnelle 1.

Club career
On July 6, 2009, Mekehout returned to CR Belouizdad after spending a season with USM Annaba.

On June 16, 2011, Mekehout, along with his CR Belouizdad teammate Amine Aksas, agreed to join Saudi Arabian club Al-Qadisiyah FC on a one-year contract.

International career
In April 2008, Mekehout was called up to the Algerian A' National Team for 2009 African Nations Championship qualifier against Morocco.

References

External links
 DZFoot Profile
 

1983 births
Living people
People from Taher
Algerian footballers
Algerian Ligue Professionnelle 1 players
CR Belouizdad players
MO Constantine players
USM Annaba players
Association football midfielders
21st-century Algerian people